Nothing but the Truth  is a 2008 film. The movie is adapted from a widely popular one-man show performed by actor and director John Kani.

The film premiered at the 2008 Durban International Film Festival.

Synopsis 
In New Brighton, South Africa, 63-year-old librarian Sipho Makhaya is getting ready to receive the body of his brother Themba, recently deceased while in exile in London and a hero of the Anti-Apartheid Movement. Nothing but the Truth investigates the contrast between those blacks who remained in South Africa and risked their lives to lead the fight against apartheid and those who returned victoriously after living in exile.

Awards 
 Écrans Noirs (Yaundé) 2009
 Fespaco (Uagadugú) 2009
 Festival de Cine de Harare 2009

References

External links 
 

2008 films
South African comedy-drama films
Apartheid films